Citadelle Gin is a French brand of gin that was first released in 1996. It is produced by Maison Ferrand in Cognac, France. It is named after the only Royal Distillery in the 18th century that was built in Dunkirk, France. It is packaged in a decorated bottle that notes each of the 19 botanicals used in its production. Its primary market is Spain.

History 
On September 5, 1775, received a royal grant to produce genièvre at the Citadel of Dunkirk. This news was not well accepted by the Trade Chamber fearing that it could jeopardize the trade of Brandies in France. Therefore, Carpeau and Stival were not allowed to sell their products within France.

In 1995 the founders of Cognac Ferrand identified the surge of super-premium gin before the category even existed, registered the trademark Citadelle and launched the brand in the United States.

Distillation 
Citadelle Gin is made using an open flame Pot Still distillation. Using a traditional Charentaise pot still used in Cognac France.  Distillation over an open flame allows the complementary aromas to come together when the wine comes into contact with the bottom of the boiler.

Citadelle Reserve 
Citadelle Gin Reserve is aged in Cognac casks, which minimizes the citrus flavor.

Awards

Citadelle has performed very well at international spirit ratings competitions, including at the San Francisco World Spiritis Competition, the Beverage Testing Institute, and Wine Enthusiast.  Proof66 rates Citadelle amongst the Top 20 gins in the world.

Citadelle Gin won the double gold medal at the San Francisco World and Spirits Competition.

Reviewers have noted that it is a mid-pungency gin, with a more complex and assertive taste than London dry gin.

References

External links
 

Products introduced in 1998
Gins